Cristoforo Terzi (1692–1743) was an Italian painter of the late-Baroque period. He was born and died in Bologna. He was a pupil of Giuseppe Maria Crespi. He painted a San Petronio kneeling before the Virgin for the church of San Giacomo Maggiore.

The Venetian pastellist Margherita Terzi was a relative.

References

1692 births
1743 deaths
17th-century Italian painters
Italian male painters
18th-century Italian painters
Painters from Bologna
Italian Baroque painters
18th-century Italian male artists